The Offences against the Person Act 1875 (38 & 39 Vict. c. 94) was an Act of the Parliament of the United Kingdom of Great Britain and Ireland (as it then was). Its purpose was to extend the scope of sexual offences against children.

Section 2
This section repealed sections 50 and 51 of the Offences against the Person Act 1861 with savings.

Section 3 - Abusing a girl under 12
This section replaced section 50 of the Offences against the Person Act 1861 (which created a felony in relation only to girls under 10).

When the Act was repealed, it was in turn replaced by section 4 of the Criminal Law Amendment Act 1885 (increasing the age to 13).

Section 4 - Abusing a girl between 12 and 13
This section replaced section 51 of the Offences against the Person Act 1861 (which created a misdemeanour in relation to girls between 10 and 12).

When the Act was repealed, it was turn replaced by section 5(1) of the Criminal Law Amendment Act 1885 (changing the age range from 13 to 16).

Section 5
This section provided that the Act was to be construed as though it and the Offences against the Person Act 1861 (as amended by this Act) were one Act. Its effect was that the definition of carnal knowledge provided by section 63 of that Act applied to the offences created by sections 3 and 4 of this Act.

Section 6 - Extent
This section provided that the Act did not extend to Scotland.

See also
Offences Against the Person Act

References

External links

English criminal law
Offences against the person
United Kingdom Acts of Parliament 1875
1875 in British law